Solstice of Oppression is the first studio release by technical death metal band Oppressor. It was released on April 9, 1994.

Track listing

Re-issues
The album was first re-issued by Megalithic Records in 1995. It was remastered and re-issued by Pavement Music in 2000 with two bonus demo tracks ("Valley of Thorns" and "I Am Darkness"). This remastered version was later re-issued by Crash Music.

Personnel
Oppressor
 Adam Zadel - Guitarist
 Tim King - Bassist, Vocals
 Tom Schofield - Drummer
 Jim Stopper - Guitarist

Production
 SV Bell - Cover art
 Ron Reid - Engineering, Producer
 Greg Derbas - Layout
 Brad Hall - Photography
 Jim Harvey - Engineering, Producer
 Tim King - Lyrics

References

1994 albums
Oppressor albums